Lewisham Road was a railway station in Lewisham, south-east London, opened in 1871 by the London, Chatham and Dover Railway (LCDR) on a branch line from  to .

It was situated on Loampit Hill, very close to the present-day St. Johns station. Although the branch line was intended to rival the South Eastern Railway's line through  it was probably the competition from this which contributed to the low use of the LCDR's branch, which closed in 1917 as a wartime economy measure.

The station building remains today as a salvage shop; the platforms have been removed but some structures remain at this level on the London-bound side. To the east of the station beyond the spur to Lewisham most traces of the branch have been removed and extensively built over, but a short stretch of embankment forms part of Brookmill Road Nature Reserve just to the north of the spur.

An application to demolish the building and replace it with a three-storey mixed commercial/private residential development was rejected in 2019.

References

Disused railway stations in the London Borough of Lewisham
Railway stations in Great Britain opened in 1871
Railway stations in Great Britain closed in 1917
Former London, Chatham and Dover Railway stations
1871 establishments in England
1917 disestablishments in England